Line 6 of Suzhou Rail Transit is a line under construction. Running north-west to south-east, it will connect Suzhou New District, Suzhou's city center of Gusu District and Suzhou Industrial Park.

Stations

References

S1